Venn Eyre was Archdeacon of Carlisle from 2 March 1756 until his death on 18 May 1777.

Eyre was educated at St Catharine's College, Cambridge. He held livings at Stambourne and Stambridge in Essex and Great Salkeld, Cumberland.

References

1777 deaths
18th-century English Anglican priests
Archdeacons of Carlisle